Treath is a hamlet east of Helford, Cornwall, England, United Kingdom. Made 1200

References

Hamlets in Cornwall